The Poisoned Diamond is a 1933 British drama film directed by W. P. Kellino and starring Lester Matthews, Anne Grey and Patric Knowles. It was made as a quota quickie for release by Columbia Pictures.

Cast
 Lester Matthews as John Reader  
 Anne Grey as Mary Davidson  
 Patric Knowles as Jack Dane  
 Raymond Raikes 
 Bryan Powley 
 Lucius Blake 
 D.J. Williams
 Hilda Campbell-Russell as Reader's Secretary

References

Bibliography
 Chibnall, Steve. Quota Quickies: The Birth of the British 'B' Film. British Film Institute, 2007.
 Low, Rachael. Filmmaking in 1930s Britain. George Allen & Unwin, 1985.
 Wood, Linda. British Films, 1927-1939. British Film Institute, 1986.

External links
 

1933 films
British drama films
1933 drama films
1930s English-language films
Films directed by W. P. Kellino
Quota quickies
British black-and-white films
1930s British films